Gene Johnson may refer to:
 Gene Johnson (defensive back) (1935–1997), American football player
 Gene Johnson (quarterback) (born 1969), American football player
 Gene Johnson (athlete) (born 1941), American high jumper
 Gene Johnson (basketball) (1902–1989), American basketball coach
 Gene Johnson (virologist), American virologist
 Gene Johnson, member of Diamond Rio

See also
Jean Johnson (disambiguation)